Dinopontiidae is a family of crustaceans belonging to the order Siphonostomatoida.

Genera:

It has the AphiaID (LSID) -135518 
 Dinopontius Stock, 1960
 Stenopontius Murnane, 1967

References

Siphonostomatoida